"My Happy Ending" is a song by Canadian singer-songwriter Avril Lavigne, written by herself and Butch Walker for her second studio album, Under My Skin (2004). Structurally, the song is written in 4/4 style and has a repeated hook in both the chorus and in the intro and outro.

"My Happy Ending" was released as the album's second single in June 2004, becoming a top-five hit in Canada, the Czech Republic, and the United Kingdom while reaching the top 10 in seven other countries, including the United States, where it peaked at number nine for four weeks. The Recording Industry Association of America (RIAA) certified the single gold in November 2004.

Critical reception
"My Happy Ending" has generally received favorable reviews from critics.  David Browne of Entertainment Weekly magazine commented "Lavigne herself sounds more burdened; ... the sk8erboi of the first album has turned out to be a selfish, nasty creep who ... treats her like crap". Allmusic highlighted the song as a "track pick" in a review of the album, Under My Skin. Blender also did the same. PopMatters thought "The second single, "My Happy Ending", suffers from a marked similarity to a few recent hits, notably Michelle Branch's "Everywhere" and Vanessa Carlton's "A Thousand Miles" (...) The ticklish good humor of "Sk8er Boi" has been subsumed by the sardonic regret of "My Happy Ending".

In an AOL Radio listener's poll, "My Happy Ending" was voted Lavigne's third best song.

, "My Happy Ending" had sold 1.2 million digital copies in the US.

Accolades

Commercial performance
In Canada, "My Happy Ending" was peaked at number eleven and it spent eleven weeks on the chart. In the US the song had commercial success,  were it peaked at number nine on the US Billboard Hot 100, on the year-end of the Hot 100 it charted at number fifty-four. It spent a total of twenty-five weeks on the chart. It climbed atop the US Mainstream Top 40 chart and spent twenty-six  weeks, and it climbed at number three on the US Adult Top 40 chart it charted for twenty-six weeks, On the US Adult Contemporary chart, it was peaked at number thirty-seven. It debuted at number eighteen on the US Digital Song Sales chart. It was certified RIAA Gold in the United States after five months reaching 500,000 copies of the single, As of September 2015, "My Happy Ending" has sold 1.2 million digital copies in the US.

In he UK, the song debuted at number five and it spent nine weeks on the chart. It was certified Silver in the UK with 200,000 units sold. In Australia, the song debuted at number six and spent thirteen weeks on the chart, it was certified Gold in Australia with 35,000 units sold. In Italy, it was peaked at number seven and it spent seventeen weeks on the chart. In Brazil, the song was certified Platinum with 60,000 units sold. Overall, "My Happy Ending" entered the top ten in ten countries.

Music video

The music video for "My Happy Ending" was written and directed by MTV and Grammy winner Meiert Avis. It was shot on location in Williamsburg, Brooklyn and Harlem, New York City. The video begins with Lavigne running down Broadway and entering a cinema (the Commodore Cinemas), where she finds the film playing is a montage of her memories concerning a specific relationship she had. At first, the memories (shown in full color) are happy, depicting Lavigne at the park with her boyfriend, as he hands her a flower and they laugh together. They are also shown goofing off inside a laundromat. However, as Lavigne sings "so much for my happy ending," the memories start losing color. Lavigne and her boyfriend lie in bed together, as she looks at him and he (obviously reeling from a disagreement) stares blankly away.

The relationship culminates during the song's bridge inside a grocery store, where her boyfriend antagonizes her, insisting that he talk to her. He grabs her and tries to pull her into his embrace. Fed up, she turns and pushes him away. She proceeds to run out of the grocery store and down the street (from the beginning of the video), and to a guitar shop where she grabs a guitar and walks to the roof of the building, where she is seen performing with her band. There, she walks past her unapologetic boyfriend without looking at him. Three other girls witness an altercation between Lavigne and her boyfriend in the restaurant and leave with Lavigne as they befriend each other. The theater film tears and the memories end, leaving the final seconds of the video as a close-up on Lavigne in the theater as she tries to decide if the break-up is happy after all.

Lavigne said of the video: "It's about a relationship that doesn't work out, and having to say goodbye to all of the memories and... all that stuff." When asked if the video for "My Happy Ending" actually contains a happy ending, Lavigne said: "I don't know if the video has a happy ending. It kind of depends on how you look at it? In one way, it is because me and 'the guy' in the video aren't together anymore, and I think that's a better thing."

Live performances
Lavigne performed the song during the closing ceremonies for the 2010 Winter Olympics.

Usage in media
"My Happy Ending" was used for the movie Bring It On: All or Nothing. The song was also used in the trailer for A Lot Like Love with Ashton Kutcher and Amanda Peet.

The song was used in a season five episode of CSI: Crime Scene Investigation, "Mea Culpa" (November 25, 2004), in a season four episode of Smallville, "Facade" (October 6, 2004) and in a season five episode of Gilmore Girls, with Dean's little sister listening to it. The song was used several episodes of MTV programs Date My Mom and Next.

The song has also appeared in video games, and has been featured in three major karaoke series: Lips, SingStar, and Karaoke Revolution.

Track listings and formats

 Australian, German, and Taiwanese CD single
 "My Happy Ending" (album version) – 4:02
 "My Happy Ending" (live acoustic version) – 3:55
 "Take Me Away" (live acoustic version) – 2:52
 "Take It"  – 2:51
 "My Happy Ending" (video) – 4:02

 United States 7-inch vinyl
 "My Happy Ending"  – 4:02
 "Don't Tell Me"  – 3:21

 Japanese CD single
 "My Happy Ending" (radio edit) – 4:02
 "My Happy Ending" (album version) – 4:02
 "Don't Tell Me" (live acoustic version) – 3:26

 European maxi-CD single
 "My Happy Ending" (album version) – 4:02
 "My Happy Ending" (live acoustic version) – 3:55
 "Take Me Away" (live acoustic version) – 2:52
 "My Happy Ending" (video) – 4:02

 European and United Kingdom CD single
 "My Happy Ending" (album version) – 4:02
 "Take It"  – 2:51

Credits and personnel
Credits and personnel are adapted from the Under My Skin album liner notes.
 Avril Lavigne – vocals, writer
 Butch Walker – writer, producer, electric guitar, bass, acoustic guitar, piano, programming
 Kenny Aronoff – drums, percussion
 Patrick Warren – keyboards, strings, Chamberlin
 Dan Chase – drum programming

Charts

Weekly charts

Year-end charts

Certifications and sales

Release history

References

2004 singles
Avril Lavigne songs
Arista Records singles
RCA Records singles
Music videos directed by Meiert Avis
Number-one singles in Italy
Record Report Pop Rock General number-one singles
Rock ballads
Songs written by Avril Lavigne
Songs written by Butch Walker
Song recordings produced by Butch Walker
2004 songs
Sony BMG singles
2000s ballads

he:Under My Skin#סינגלים
lt:Under My Skin#My Happy Ending
Grunge songs
Gothic rock songs